The Divisiones Regionales de Fútbol in the Community of Galicia, are organized by Federación Gallega de Fútbol :
Preferente Autonómica de Galicia (Level 6 of the Spanish football pyramid)
Primeira Autonómica de Galicia (Level 7)
Segunda Autonómica de Galicia (Level 8)
Terceira Autonómica de Galicia (Level 9)

League chronology
Timeline

Preferente Autonómica de Galicia

The Preferente Autonómica de Galicia is one of the lower levels of the Spanish Football League. It is held every year. It stands at the sixth level of Spanish football. All of the clubs are based in the autonomous community of Galicia.

League format
The league played in two groups of 20 teams each. At the end of the season, the champion and runner-up from each group are promoted to Tercera División RFEF - Group 1. The third placed teams play a promotion play-off to fill any vacancies in Tercera RFEF. Three teams from each group are relegated to Primeira Autonómica. (Additional teams could be relegated if there are more teams relegated to Tercera División than that are promoted; both Tercera División and Autonómica Preferente groups have a limit of 20 clubs.)

Current clubs 2022–23

Champions

External links
Preferente Autonómica - Norte
Preferente Autonómica - Sur

Primeira Autonómica de Galicia

Primera División Autonómica de Galicia is the seventh level of the Spanish football league system. It is administered by the Galician Football Federation.

League format
The league is played in five groups of 18 teams each. At the end of the season, the champion each group are promoted to Autonómica Preferente plus the winner of a playoff tie between the runners-up from groups 1 & 2, runners-up from groups 3 & 4 and runner-up & 3rd place from group 5. Three teams in Group 1 & 2 and two each in Group 3, 4 & 5 are relegated to Segunda Autonómica. (Further relegations may be needed to maintain 18 clubs in each group.)

Some teams playing in this level
Arteixo
Juventud Cambados
Moaña
Verín
Meirás

External links
Primera Autonómica Grupo 1
Primera Autonómica Grupo 2
Primera Autonómica Grupo 3
Primera Autonómica Grupo 4

Segunda Autonómica de Galicia

The Segunda Autonómica de Galicia is one of the lower levels of the Spanish Football League. It is held every year. It stands at the eighth level of Spanish football. All of the clubs are based in the autonomous community of Galicia.

League format
The league is played in thirteen groups of 16-18 teams. At the end of the season, the champions from groups 1-6, 12 & 13, the winners of the play-off of the runners-up from groups 1, 2 & 4 and groups 3, 5 & 6 and the champions and runners-up from groups 7-11 are promoted to Primeira Autonómica. Two teams are relegated from groups 1, 3, 7-10 & 12-13, three relegated from 2 & 11, four from 5 & 6 and only one from 4.

Some teams playing in this level
Becerreá
Brollón
Riotorto
Tomiño

Terceira Autonómica de Galicia

The Terceira Autonómica de Galicia is stands at the ninth level of Spanish football. All of the clubs are based in the autonomous community of Galicia.

The League
The league played in 19 groups of 12-19 teams each. At the end of the season, the champion of each group is promoted to Segunda Autonómica de Galicia plus runners-up from groups 1, 4-5, 11-12 & 18-19; runners-up thru fourth from 13 & 14; the six playoff winners from 3rd-6th's of groups 1, 4, 11-12 & 18-19; seven winners from 2nd-5th's of groups 1, 3 and 6-10; three winners from 2nd-5th's of groups 15-17 and the qualifying-playoff winner between 3rd of group 5 & 2nd worst from Segunda Autonómica group 4.

Some teams playing in this level
Mesón do Bento

External links
Federación Gallega de Fútbol
futbolme.com
siguetuliga

Divisiones Regionales de Fútbol
Football in Galicia (Spain)